The 1998 Norwest Sun Bowl was played by the TCU Horned Frogs and the USC Trojans. This was the 65th Sun Bowl held and the last sponsored by Norwest Corporation due to next year's game being held by Wells Fargo.

Background
Paul Hackett was in his first year (of three) with USC, having led them to a bowl game for the first time since the 1996 Rose Bowl. This would be Hackett's only bowl game with USC.

TCU hadn't been to a bowl game since the 1994 Independence Bowl nor won one since the 1957 Cotton Bowl Classic. Despite having only a 6–5 record, they were invited to a bowl game due to the Big Ten not having enough bowl-eligible teams. They were coached by first year head coach Dennis Franchione.

Game summary
Basil Mitchell had only 19 carries but ran for 185 yards and two touchdowns as TCU scored on their first three possessions and dominated the time of possession in the first half (having the ball for 20:15). TCU quarterback Patrick Batteaux also had two touchdowns for TCU, both rushing. But Carson Palmer (who had 280 yards passing) threw two touchdowns (one to Billy Miller and the other to Petros Papadakis) that made it 28–16 going into the fourth quarter. After stopping TCU on a drive, the Trojans got the ball back and drove to the TCU 20 early in the fourth quarter. But TCU's defense stuffed their offense, as USC kicked a field goal to make 28–19. From that point on, TCU ate up most of the clock as USC did not score again, giving TCU their first bowl win since 1957 in what would be the first of six consecutive bowl appearances.
 
Defensive Lineman London Dunlap was named Jimmy Rogers, Jr. Most Valuable Lineman and Running back Basil Mitchell was named C.M. Hendricks Most Valuable Player.

References

1998–99 NCAA football bowl games
Sun Bowl
TCU Horned Frogs football bowl games
USC Trojans football bowl games
December 1998 sports events in the United States
1998 in sports in Texas